Span may refer to:

Science, technology and engineering
 Span (unit), the width of a human hand 
 Span (engineering), a section between two intermediate supports
 Wingspan, the distance between the wingtips of a bird or aircraft
 Sorbitan esters, also known as a spans
 Nebbiolo, an Italian wine grape also known as Span

Mathematics
 Linear span, or simply span, in linear algebra
 Span (category theory)

Computing
 <span>, an HTML element; See span and div
 Switched Port Analyzer, Cisco implementation of port mirroring
 Smartphone ad hoc network
 Critical path length in analysis of parallel algorithms

Other uses
 Span (band), a Norwegian rock band
 SPAN magazine, a publication of the US Embassy, New Delhi, India; see former editor V. D. Trivadi
 Saudi Payments Network
 CME SPAN, Standard Portfolio Analysis of Risk, for futures contracts
 Span Developments, former UK builder

People
 Denard Span (born 1984), a baseball outfielder
 Henrik Span Danish shipbuilder and admiral (1634 - 1694)
 Span., taxonomic author abbreviation of Johan Baptist Spanoghe (1798–1838), Dutch botanical collector